The International Academy of Ceramics (IAC) or Académie Internationale de la Céramique (AIC)  is an international professional association of ceramic artists. It is based in Geneva and operates worldwide. Since 1958 the IAC has been affiliated with UNESCO, initially on a consultative basis and as an official partner in the cultural sector since 2001.

The IAC was founded in 1952 by Henry J. Reynaud with the purpose of fostering friendship and communication between ceramicists throughout the world. This is accomplished by, among other things, developing and endorsing all forms of international cooperation to promote ceramics and support production at the highest level of quality. The academy is the only organization dedicated to the medium of clay that operates on an international level.

Every two years, the AIC organizes an international conference and issues a bulletin about its projects and activities. New members are also elected every two years. In 2020 the association will have 807 individual and 77 collective members in 74 countries. The Norwegian Torbjørn Kvasbø is the association's president for the period covering 2018 - 2024.

In 2021 IAC launched the website Ceramic World Destinations, created with input by all AIC members. This website lists cultural locations that may be worthwhile for visitors with an interest in ceramics.

References

External links 
 
 

International cultural organizations
Organizations established in 1952
International organizations based in France